They Died in Vain: Overlooked, Underappreciated and Forgotten Mystery Novels is a 2002 book by Jim Huang. Published by Crum Creek Press, it won the Anthony Award for Best Critical Work in 2003.

References 

2002 non-fiction books
Anthony Award-winning works